The flag of Kuwait was adopted on September 7, 1961, and officially hoisted November 24, 1961. Before 1961, the flag of Kuwait was red and white, like those of other Persian Gulf states at the time, with the field being red and words or charges being written in white. 

When The Utub settled in Kuwait, Kuwaiti ships were flying a flag common on the western coast of the Persian Gulf, a red flag added to it near the mast a serrated white ribbon similar to the current Bahrain flag and was called in the name of the Sulaimi flag. This flag was raised in the rule of Sheikh Sabah I bin Jaber in 1746 to 1871. 

During the period of Ottoman rule in Kuwait, the Ottoman flag, red with a white crescent and star, was used. This flag was retained after the country became a British protectorate in the Anglo-Kuwaiti Agreement of 1899. 

In 1903, Lord Curzon, the British Viceroy and Governor-General of India visited Kuwait, and  Sheikh Mubarak Al-Sabah received him and raised a red flag With White Words, توكلنا على الله (We trust in God) in Arabic writing. The raising of this flag was a smart move, as Kuwait was under British protection and could not raise the Ottoman flag upon visiting British Viceroy in India to Kuwait. 

Two different flag designs were proposed but not adopted in the period after this. The first proposal in 1906, a red flag with white Western letters spelling (KOWEIT) and the second in 1913, the Ottoman flag but the word كويت (Kuwait) in Arabic writing as a canton.

The Ottoman flag kept being used until the First World War, when friendly-fire incidents with the British in 1914 during the Mesopotamian campaign around the river Shatt al-Arab occurred due to Kuwait and the enemy Ottomans both using the same flag. Because of this Kuwait adopted a new flag, red with كويت (Kuwait) in Arabic writing. This flag was in use until 1921, when Sheikh Ahmad Al-Jaber Al-Sabah added the Shahada to the flag. This version was in use until 1940, when he also added a stylized falcons claw to the flag. These flags were also depicted on the Emblems of Kuwait. The red flag remained the national flag of Kuwait until the adoption of the current one in September 1961. The present flag is in the Pan-Arab colours, but each colour is also significant in its own right.

The colours' meaning came from a poem by Safie Al-Deen Al-Hali:
White are our deeds
Black are our battles
Green are our lands
Red are our swords
Rules of hanging and flying the flag:
Horizontally: The green stripe should be on top.
Vertically: The red stripe should be on the left side of the flag.

In 2005, it became the design of the world's largest kite at a size of 1019 square metres. It was made in New Zealand by Peter Lynn, launched to the public for the first time in 2004 in the United Kingdom, officially launched in Kuwait in 2005, and has not been surpassed since.

Construction sheet

Standard of the Emir 
The current Emir of Kuwait has a personal royal standard, which is the national flag with a yellow crown on the green stripe.

Historical flags of Kuwait

References

Flags introduced in 1961
Flags of Asia
Flag
Kuwait